James Becket is a writer and filmmaker who currently uses documentary film to address issues of social justice and the environment. Previously he wrote, directed, and produced  independent feature films and, as a journalist and human-rights  lawyer, he reported on and engaged with important political events and social problems in Europe and Latin America.

Education

B.A. Williams College (Highest Honors). Becket graduated from Harvard Law School in 1962. Instituto de Economia, University of Chile (Fulbright Scholar), Graduate Institute of International Studies, Geneva, Switzerland.

Biography

Journalist

In the 1960s Becket began writing as a foreign correspondent from Europe, Latin America and Africa. His reports and articles appeared amongst others in The New Republic, The Nation, the New York Times, the Christian Science Monitor, Journal de Genève etc.  He also contributed to scholarly journals on issues of land reform, economic development, and international human rights law.

Human Rights Lawyer and the Greek Dictatorship

In April 1967 a junta of Greek Colonels  seized power in Greece. Becket and his Greek wife, Maria Becket became active in the resistance and the international movement to restore democracy in Greece. Amnesty International sent Becket and barrister Anthony Marreco  to Athens to investigate alleged human rights violations. Their Report which emphasized the regime’s use of torture based on first hand testimony was widely reported in global media. Three Scandinavian countries brought the Greek Case before the European Commission of Human Rights Becket wrote Barbarism in Greece documenting torture and continued writing articles, appearing on television such as the National Broadcasting Company (NBC) and British Broadcasting Company (BBC) in the conflict with the regime over public opinion. When the European Commission was to hold hearings in Strasbourg, the Beckets organized the escapes of torture victims from Greece who gave first hand testimony to the Commission. Becket also appeared as a witness. The violation of Article 3 of the European Convention on Human Rights prohibiting torture  proved to be a key issue in the Commission’s decision to condemn the dictatorship leading to its exit from the Council of Europe. Becket was declared persona non grata by the Greek regime.

United Nations High Commissioner for Refugees

From 1974 to 1981 Becket served as UNHCR’s Director of Public Information during a period “characterized by a considerable increase in the scale and scope of the work of UNHCR.” He acted as the spokesperson for the organization and produced news stories and documentaries on the major refugee stories of the day including the Vietnamese boat people, Cambodian refugees fleeing genocide, African refugees fleeing wars and apartheid.

Filmmaking

In 1981 Becket moved to Los Angeles to pursue a film career. His first film was in 1971 in Chile producing the political film Que Hacer with a group of radical Chileans and Americans during the Salvador Allende election. The film put its actors in real life election situations including speaking with Allende in character. The film received mixed reviews and was in numerous film festivals including the Cannes Film Festival. The 1973 coup overthrowing Allende sent the Chileans who worked on the film into exile or to their death. Working with UNHCR, he made a number of documentaries on refugees, including one on Chilean refugees. His writing of screenplays enabled him to expand into directing and producing and his international experience led him to direct movies with progressive political content in Chile (Southern Cross), Thailand (Natural Causes), Nicaragua, Sudan, and Jordan (Sanctuary).

In television, he directed two After School Specials dealing with such themes as child sexual abuse. He also wrote episodes for Miami Vice and Crime Story. In 1999 he created Becket Films and began producing documentary films on health and ecology. In the health field Becket produced films on childhood epilepsy  (his young daughter suffered from epilepsy) and stroke recovery. He produced a series of eight films on ship-borne symposia that brought together religious leaders and scientists, long estranged, to find common ground on the issue of the environment. Each symposium, under the Ecumenical Patriarch Bartholomew, ‘The Green Patriarch’, traveled seven bodies of water in ecological jeopardy ranging from the Amazon to the Arctic to the Adriatic. Becket’s most recent efforts include Sons of Africa (2014) where the sons of two bitter enemies scale Kilimanjaro on a Peace Climb and The Seeds of Vandana Shiva (2020) recounting the life story of the Indian eco-activist, Dr. Vandana Shiva.

Feature films

 Que Hacer? (1972) Co-filmmaker, Lobo Films (Directors’ Fortnight, Cannes Film Festival, Critics’ Award, Mannheim).
 Ulterior Motives (1991), Writer/Director, (Thomas Ian Griffith, Ken Howard, Mary Page Keller), Den Pictures,
 Natural Causes (1994), Director, (Linda Purl, Will Patton, Ali MacGraw), (Pacific Rim .Best Foreign Film, Houston Film Festival)
 The Best Revenge (1995) Writer/Director, (Carlos Riccelli, Robert Pine), Becket Films. (Winner Best Feature , Breckenridge Film Festival)
 Plato’s Run (1996), Writer/Director, (Roy Scheider, Gary Busey), NuImage Films.
 Southern Cross (1999), Writer/Director/Producer, (Malcolm McDowell, Esai Morales, Michael Ironside), Bon Films.
 Junior Pilot (2006), Writer/Director, (Mark Dacascos, Eric Roberts, Larry Miller), Green Communications.

Television
 Je Suis un Refugie (1979) Writer/Director, UNHCR, First Prize Cork Film Festival
 Sanctuary,(1982) Writer/Director, PBS, Cindy Awards, Best in Festival awards
 Crime Story (1988) Writer, Going Home  27 February 1988
 Miami Vice (1988) Writer, Heart of Night 31 August 1988
 Big Boys Don’t Cry (1992) Director, CBS Schoolbreak Special, Churchill Films, Humanitas Award
 Fast Forward (1994) Director, ABC Afterschool Special, Wild Films, Humanitas Award
 Guns in School (1993) Director, PSA, George Foster Peabody Award.

Screenplays

Becket has written thirty screenplays of which ten have been produced.

Documentaries

The Aegean: The Apocalypse, (1995) Producer/Director, RSE.
The Adriatic: A Sea at Risk, A Unity of Purpose (1998), Producer/Director, RSE.
El Misterio del Capital de los Indigenas Amazonicas, (2002), ILD,
The Baltic: A Sea in Peril, (2003) Producer/Director, RSE.
The Amazon: The End of Infinity (2004),Producer/Director, RSE.
Childhood Epilepsy ‘What you need to know’. (2005)
Diagnosis Epilepsy: Now what? (2006) Winner 2007 Telly Award
The Arctic: The Consequences of Human Folly, (2006), Producer/Director, RSE.
The Green Patriarch, (2008) Producer/Director, RSE, 2008
Stroke Recovery: Taking Back Our Lives, (2010) Producer/Director, Becket Films.
The Mississippi: At The Tipping Point (2011) Producer/Director, RSE, 2011
Sons of Africa,(2014) Producer/Director, Journeyman Pictures. Winner Best Doc, Seattle Independent Film Festival, Borrego Springs Festival
The Seeds of Vandana Shiva (2020), Producer/Director with Camilla Denton, Becket Films

Books

 (1969) Barbarism in Greece Walker and Company (also translated and published in Swedish, Italian, Greek, and Turkish)
 (1973) (with Elise Smith) First Amnesty International Report on Torture, Duckworth’s,
 (1998) Inca Gold  Bantam 
 (1992) Murder on the Tour de France  Bantam

Selected articles

(14 May1962) "Report from a Troubled Colony” The New Republic

(16 May1964) "Autogestion: Algeria’s Socialist Experiment" The Economic Weekly,

(23 May 1964) “Algeria’s War Orphans” Christian Science Monitor

(19 July1966) “Suez, dix ans apres, Les consequences de la nationalisation" Journal de Genève

(29 December 1967) “Chile’s Mini-Revolution” Commonweal

(27 May 1968) “Torture in Democracy’s Homeland” Christianity and Crisis

(March 1968) “The Real Latin America (photographic essay)” Renewal

( March, 1968) “How I Became National Champion: Letter from Bolivia” Skiing

(6 January1969) “Greek Junta on Trial” The Nation

April 1970 pp 44–49) “Inquisition Greek style” Ramparts Magazine

(4 August 1972) "Torture as an Institution" New York Times

(March 1978)  "The Subjective Camera as Leading Character" American Cinematographer

Notes and references

External links
 
 

20th-century American journalists
21st-century American journalists
American male journalists
American political writers
Writers from New York City
1936 births
Williams College alumni
Harvard Law School alumni
Living people
Graduate Institute of International and Development Studies alumni